Kåre Olaf Berg (8 September 1932 – 12 December 2021) was a Norwegian ski jumper. He competed in the individual event at the 1960 Winter Olympics. He died in Gran on 12 December 2021, at the age of 89.

References

External links
 

1932 births
2021 deaths
Norwegian male ski jumpers
Olympic ski jumpers of Norway
Ski jumpers at the 1960 Winter Olympics
People from Gran, Norway
Sportspeople from Innlandet
20th-century Norwegian people